Gianfrancesco Galeani Napione also noted as Francesco Galeani Napione, count of Cocconato  (1 November 1748 – 12 June 1830) was a renowned Italian historian and writer.

Biography 
Napione was born at Turin.  In 1773, he published "Saggio sopra l'arte storica", dedicating the work to Vittorio Amedeo III of savoy.

In 1780, he published "Osservazioni intorno al progetto di pace tra S.M. e le potenze barbaresche", where he proposed the formation of a confederation of maritime Italian states under the auspices of the Papal States.

Opposed to French expansionism, his writings promoted the House of Savoy as the leaders of the Italian states.

In 1791, he published his best known work, "Dell'uso e dei pregi della lingua italiana"

In 1812, he was elected as a member of the new Accademia della Crusca.  He died in Turin.

References 

1748 births
1830 deaths
Counts of Italy
18th-century Italian historians
People from the Kingdom of Sardinia
Writers from Turin
19th-century Italian historians